West Tyrone is a parliamentary constituency in the United Kingdom House of Commons. The current MP for the constituency is Órfhlaith Begley of Sinn Féin.

Constituency profile
The seat is rural and includes the towns of Strabane and Omagh.

Boundaries

Since the constituency's creation in 1997, it has consisted of the territory of the former Districts of Omagh and Strabane. There were major local government boundary changes in 2015, but the constituency boundaries remained unchanged.

The seat was created in a boundary review conducted in 1995 and was predominantly made out of the western half of the old Mid Ulster constituency – indeed it contains more of the old Mid Ulster than the current seat of that name. It also contains parts of the old Foyle constituency.

Although the Boundary Commission altered several Northern Ireland constituencies for the 2010 general election, West Tyrone was left unchanged.

History
For the history of the equivalent seat prior to 1997, see Mid Ulster.

The seat is overwhelmingly nationalist, as evidenced by the election results in which nationalist parties have always won over 50% of the vote since the seat was created. However, the nationalist vote has traditionally been split between the Social Democratic and Labour Party (SDLP) and Sinn Féin, whilst the unionist parties have been more willing to make pacts to increase their chances of victory.

When the seat was created it was nominally held by the Democratic Unionist Party (DUP), based on mapping the 1992 general election results onto the new boundaries, but this was because the Ulster Unionist Party (UUP) had not contested the equivalent area. In the 1996 Forum elections the UUP outpolled the DUP and it was agreed that the DUP would not contest the seat. As a result, William Thompson of the UUP won in 1997 with a narrow majority over the SDLP, with Sinn Féin coming third on a large vote.

During the Parliament that followed, the Omagh bombing took place in the constituency, killing 29 people.

In the 2001 general election the SDLP and Sinn Féin both targeted the constituency heavily, in the hope that a shift in the vote from one nationalist party to the other would enable them to outpoll the Ulster Unionists. In the event Sinn Féin's Pat Doherty won.

In 1998 both Sinn Féin and the SDLP won two seats in the Northern Ireland Assembly, with the UUP and DUP winning one each. However, there was much speculation that an increase in Sinn Féin's vote at the SDLP's expense would result in Sinn Féin taking a seat from its nationalist rival at the next assembly election. However, the election was complicated by the intervention of the independent candidate Dr. Kieran Deeny, campaigning on the sole issue of the retention of the hospital in Omagh. In a result that shocked commentators he took one of the SDLP's assembly seats.

Deeny stood again in the 2005 general election and asked most parties to withdraw to support him. Many local activists and voters appeared to agree with this, with some making their support public, but in the end the UUP, DUP and SDLP all fielded candidates. Doherty held the seat for Sinn Féin, but with Deeny polling strongly in second place.

Members of Parliament 
The Member of Parliament since the 2017 general election was Barry McElduff of Sinn Féin. Between 2001 and 2017, the MP was Pat Doherty of Sinn Féin, and the MP between 1997 and 2001 was William Thompson of the Ulster Unionist Party.

On 15 January 2018, McElduff announced his resignation as MP following a video he posted on Twitter that appeared to mock victims of the Kingsmill massacre.

Elections

Elections in the 2010s

Elections in the 2000s

Elections in the 1990s

See also 
 List of parliamentary constituencies in Northern Ireland

References

Bibliography
 
2017 Election House Of Commons Library 2017 Election report
A Vision Of Britain Through Time (Constituency elector numbers)
Politics Resources

Westminster Parliamentary constituencies in Northern Ireland
Constituencies of the Parliament of the United Kingdom established in 1997
Politics of County Tyrone